Diodora candida is a species of sea snail, a marine gastropod mollusk in the family Fissurellidae, the keyhole limpets.

Description
The size of the shell reaches 11 mm.

Distribution
This species occurs in the Atlantic Ocean off the Cape Verdes.

References

  Rolán E., 2005. Malacological Fauna From The Cape Verde Archipelago. Part 1, Polyplacophora and Gastropoda.

External links
 

Fissurellidae
Gastropods described in 1835
Gastropods of Cape Verde